Rydaz Redemption is the debut album by rapper Mr. Envi'. It was released on August 23, 2011.

Track listing
Intro — 1:00
I'mma Boss — 3:55
In Tha Streets (featuring J.B. & Money) — 3:02
Lavish (featuring Blade) — 3:35
I Just Wanna (featuring Truehillz & S.G. — 3:35
Spotlight — 3:00
Cold Outside — 4:10
I Be On Tha Block (featuring Blade) — 3:30
Gettin' To Tha Paper (featuring Mista T, Fuol, S.G., Mayjor & Bigg Redd) — 4:00
Do Tha Thang (featuring S.G. & Keyki') — 4:44
Boss Shit (featuring Money) — 4:50
Get At Me — 3:25
Do It Big (featuring S.G. & Bigg Redd) — 4:28

References

External links

2011 debut albums
Mr. Envi' albums